The Very Best of Robert Palmer is a 1995 compilation album by British singer Robert Palmer.  Re-issued in 1997 with the addition of "Addicted To Love '97".

1997 Re-issue Track listing
 "Addicted To Love '97" – 5:18
 "Bad Case of Loving You" – 3:10
 "Simply Irresistible" – 4:12
 "Get It On (Bang a Gong)" by Power Station – 5:29
 "Some Guys Have All the Luck" – 3:08
 "I Didn't Mean to Turn You On" – 3:36
 "Looking for Clues" – 4:58
 "You Are in My System" – 4:58
 "Some Like It Hot" by Power Station – 5:05
 "Respect Yourself" – 4:05
 "I'll Be Your Baby Tonight" with UB40 – 3:23
 "Johnny and Mary" – 3:59
 "She Makes My Day" – 4:21
 "Know by Now" – 4:09
 "Every Kinda People" – 3:20
 "Mercy Mercy Me/I Want You" – 5:53
 "Addicted to Love" (Original Version) – 4:25

Charts

Weekly charts

Year-end charts

Certifications

References

1995 greatest hits albums
Robert Palmer (singer) compilation albums
Capitol Records compilation albums